The World Magnetic Tour was a 2008–2010 concert tour by American heavy metal band Metallica in support of the band's ninth studio album, Death Magnetic, which was released on September 12, 2008.

The tour officially kicked off in October 2008 in San Francisco, United States, following three European promotional dates in September and two U.S. rehearsal shows. By September 2010, the tour had reached North America, Europe, South America, Asia and Oceania.

The tour culminated with three dates in Melbourne, Australia, in late November 2010. The tour ended up being the most successful by Metallica, grossing roughly $217.2 million (the 18th highest grossing tour of all time), with the top grossing location, Acer Arena in Sydney, Australia, taking more than $14 million over four shows.

Overview
A North American leg, their first since the Madly in Anger with the World Tour in 2004, began in Phoenix, Arizona, and wrapped up in late December in Oakland, California. The leg continued in early January 2009, starting in Milwaukee and finishing up in Newark, New Jersey, in early February.

In February 2009, the band commenced a European tour. The group played three rounds of dates, resuming in late March and then returning again in May. In between the first and second legs, the band performed a small promotional show in Austin, Texas, U.S. to support the video game release Guitar Hero: Metallica. The European legs began in Nottingham, England, and eventually culminated in Cologne, Germany.

In June 2009, the group played three dates in Mexico City. The shows reached a total capacity of 158,349 and were the band's first shows in Mexico in ten years. Later in the month, the group returned to Europe, performing a mixture of indoor and outdoor shows, and festival appearances. The leg featured headline slots at the first iterations of the Sonisphere Festival, a new festival event which took place in Finland, Germany, the Netherlands, Spain, Sweden and the UK. The leg began in Helsinki and finished in early August in Knebworth, England.

In September 2009, the band kicked off a third North American leg, beginning in Nashville, Tennessee, and finishing in mid-November in New York City. The act resumed touring duties in December, performing five dates in the Western U.S.

In January 2010, the band headed to South America, playing mostly outdoor shows. The leg kicked off in Lima and finished in São Paulo, Brazil. In March, the group returned to Mexico, performing in Guadalajara and Monterrey. The leg continued on with additional dates in South America, as well as shows in Central America. The band also performed for the first time in countries such as Puerto Rico, Costa Rica and Guatemala.

In April 2010, the act once again returned to Europe, beginning with two dates in Oslo. The leg included appearances at the 2010 editions of the Sonisphere Festival, which featured exclusive billings of the "Big Four" of thrash metal: Slayer, Megadeth and Anthrax, as well as Metallica. The events took place in Poland, Switzerland, Czech Republic, Bulgaria, Greece, Romania and Turkey. The band also returned to Israel in May, for the third time in their career.

In September 2010, the band kicked off one of three legs in Oceania, followed by two dates in Tokyo. In mid-October and late November 2010, the group returned for additional concerts in Oceania. The group also played a show in the United States in early November for the Call of Duty: Black Ops launch party. The entire tour culminated with three dates in Melbourne, Australia.

The dates in Mexico City were recorded and later released on CD, DVD and Blu-ray with the title, Orgullo, Pasión y Gloria ("Pride, Passion and Glory"). Additionally, the show in Nîmes, France, was filmed and subsequently released on DVD and Blu-ray entitled, Français Pour Une Nuit ("French for One Night"). Both titles were released to retail in November 2009 only in their respective markets (South America and France) and through the band's official website.

The band's performance at the Sonisphere Festival in Sofia was beamed to more than 450 movie theatres in more than 140 markets in the U.S. and select cities in Europe, Canada and South America on June 22, 2010. The live video was later released on DVD and Blu-ray in October 2010, entitled The Big 4 Live from Sofia, Bulgaria.

According to concert magazine Pollstar, the tour was the tenth highest-grossing for 2009 with revenue of US$89.1 million from 78 shows, and ranked fifth in 2010 with revenue of $110.1 million. Overall, the tour grossed $217,245,629 from 164 reported shows across two years with an attendance of over 2.6 million people.

This was the first time Metallica ever played in Puerto Rico. They were originally going to play on April 28, 1993, at Hiram Bithorn Stadium on the Nowhere Else to Roam Tour, but the rains that day reached a level of over two feet, which would have been a hazardous situation if the band had played.

First typical setlist
(Taken from the Sofia, Bulgaria, Vasil Levski Stadium show on June 22, 2010)

 "Creeping Death"
 "For Whom the Bell Tolls"
 "Fuel"
 "Harvester of Sorrow"
 "Fade to Black"
 "That Was Just Your Life"
 "Cyanide"
 "Sad but True"
 "Welcome Home (Sanitarium)"
 "All Nightmare Long"
 "One"
 "Master of Puppets"
 "Blackened"
 "Nothing Else Matters"
 "Enter Sandman"
 "Am I Evil?" (originally performed by Diamond Head) (with Anthrax, Megadeth and Dave Lombardo of Slayer)
 "Hit the Lights"
 "Seek & Destroy"

Second typical setlist
(Taken from the Christchurch, New Zealand, CBS Canterbury Arena show on September 21, 2010)

 "That Was Just Your Life"
 "The End of the Line"
 "For Whom the Bell Tolls"
 "Fuel"
 "Fade to Black"
 "Broken, Beat & Scarred"
 "No Remorse"
 "Sad but True"
 "Welcome Home (Sanitarium)"
 "All Nightmare Long"
 "One"
 "Master of Puppets"
 "Battery"
 "Nothing Else Matters"
 "Enter Sandman"
 "Stone Cold Crazy" (originally performed by Queen)
 "Whiplash"
 "Seek & Destroy"

Tour dates

 1^ = Open to invited guests, fan club members and contest winners ).
 2^ = Rescheduled from March 8, 2009.
 3^ = Benefit show for Marin History Museum's new "Marin Rocks" exhibition, opening in 2010.

Canceled dates

Support acts

Songlist

Box office score data

Personnel
 James Hetfield – vocals, rhythm guitar
 Kirk Hammett – lead guitar
 Lars Ulrich – drums
 Robert Trujillo – bass

See also
 List of highest grossing concert tours

References

External links
 
 Metallica on Tour
 LiveMetallica.com

Metallica concert tours
2008 concert tours
2009 concert tours
2010 concert tours